NRE, an acronym or initialism, may refer to:

National Railway Equipment Company
National Register of Electors, in Canada
Negative regulatory element
New relationship energy
Non-recurring engineering
In fluid mechanics and heat transfer, NRe is a common notation for the Reynolds number
 Natural Resources and Environment
 Australia, see Forests Commission Victoria
 Malaysia, under the Ministry of Science, Technology and Innovation (Malaysia)
 United states, Under Secretary of Agriculture for Natural Resources and Environment or USA(NRE)
 Null Reference Exception (Null_pointer#Null_dereferencing)